Langona minima is a jumping spider species in the genus Langona that lives in Kenya. The female was first described in 1949.

References

Endemic fauna of Kenya
Fauna of Kenya
Salticidae
Spiders described in 1949
Spiders of Africa